Gamow is a large lunar impact crater on the far side of the Moon. It is located in the northern hemisphere, to the southeast of the walled plain Schwarzschild. The crater is named after the Russian-American physicist George Gamow.

This is a worn and eroded feature, with a rim that has been battered and overlain by multiple impacts. Gamow V is attached to the western exterior, and the joined crater pair Gamow A and Gamow B overlie the northeastern side. The eastern rim is the most damaged section, while the rim to the west is free from impacts. The western inner wall does display a fine radial groove texture, but is otherwise nearly featureless. Near the midpoint is a palimpsest, or ghost-crater feature consisting of just the rim projecting up through the otherwise relatively level surface.

Satellite craters
By convention these features are identified on lunar maps by placing the etter on the side of the crater midpoint that is closest to Gamow.

References

 
 
 
 
 
 
 
 
 
 
 
 

Impact craters on the Moon